The Spain women's national under 18 ice hockey team is the national under-18 ice hockey team in Spain. The team represents Spain at the International Ice Hockey Federation's IIHF World Women's U18 Division I Group B - Qualifications.

World Women's U18 Championship record

*Includes one loss in extra time (in the round robin)

I
Women's national under-18 ice hockey teams